is a partially elevated railway station on the Hanshin Electric Railway Main Line, just east of Sumiyoshi River, Japan. At Motomachi, a number of limited express trains carry on along the Sanyo Railway to Himeji city.

It is also possible to change at this station for the Rokko Liner, a driverless system from JR Sumiyoshi to Rokko Island. The two stations of Uozaki are linked by a covered walkway.

Lines

Hanshin Main Line

Layout

There are two tracks and two side platforms.  It also has lifts and escalators, as well as waiting rooms on each platform.

History 
Uozaki Station opened on the Hanshin Main Line on 12 April 1905.

Service was suspended owing to the Great Hanshin earthquake in January 1995. Restoration work on the Hanshin Main Line took 7 months to complete.

Station numbering was introduced on 21 December 2013, with Uozaki being designated as station number HS-25.

Gallery

Kobe New Transit Line

Layout

The station has two tracks and two side platforms. It also has lifts and escalators.

History 
The station on the Kobe New Transit Line opened on 21 February 1990.

Gallery

Surroundings
Sumiyoshi River

References

External links
Hanshin Line station website (in Japanese)
Kobe New Transit Line station website (in Japanese)

Railway stations in Kobe
Railway stations in Japan opened in 1905
Railway stations in Japan opened in 1990